Delfy and His Friends is a Spanish animated series for children, produced in 1992 by D'Ocon Films. 91 episodes were produced for TVE.

Synopsis 
The series focuses on the underwater adventures of Delfy the Dolphin and his friends. In every episode, they are compelled to defend their habitat from the schemes of a greedy vulture, his kangaroo assistant and a group of sharks.

Characters

Protagonists
 Delfy - a young, blue dolphin with a captain hat. He serves as the main protagonist of the series.
 Chees - a female dolphin and Delfy's girlfriend.
 Fasty - a Hermit crab.
 Rudy - a crab.
 Baby Whale - a young whale.
 Froggy - Delfy's best friend. He is a green monkfish in the original version. Strangely, in some other versions, he claims he is a frog.
 The Hammerhead shark - a gentle shark.
 The Swordfish
 The octopus
 Police Agent - a fish who travels on his sea horse's back.
 The turtle
 Dan - a walrus and Delfy's friend, this character stays on land. He works in a lighthouse.
 Mick - a and friendly puppy.
 Gigi - a female puppy and Mick's best friend.

Antagonists 
 Captain Vinager - a vulture, Delfy's worst enemy and the main antagonist of the series. He is a pirate and always attacks the aquatic animals.
 Boing - an unintelligent kangaroo and Vinager's partner.
 Sharky - a pirate shark.
 Sharko - another pirate shark, he serves as Sharky's companion.

References

External links 
 

Spanish children's animated adventure television series
Australian Broadcasting Corporation original programming
Animated television series about mammals
Animated television series about arthropods
Animated television series about fish